Encephalartos lebomboensis is a species of cycad in the family Zamiaceae. Native to the Lebombo Mountains of South Africa, the species was first described in 1949 by the South African botanist Inez Verdoorn. It is commonly known as the Lebombo cycad, although the name is also used for Encephalartos senticosus which also occurs in the same locality.

Description
Often a number of stems form a clump. The crown of pinnate leaves are stiff, each having a mid to dark green glossy upper surface and paler under side. They are densely hairy at first but soon become hairless. The leaflets are lanceolate and have serrated edges. Near the base of the leaves, the leaflets are reduced to prickles.

E. lebomboensis is a dioecious species, that is, with separate male and female plants. The seed coats are glossy red.

Distribution
Encephalartos lebomboensis has two separate populations, one in the vicinity of Mananga in Mpumalanga province in South Africa and a southern population centred on Piet Retiefion in the upper Pongola River Valley. It is a very rare and endangered species and grows in sunny positions on cliffs and steep, rocky slopes among sparse vegetation. This region has hot, fairly wet summers and cool, dry winters with frequent mists. It is also native to Mozambique and Eswatini.

Taxonomy
The form of this cycad found in the southern locality differs in certain characteristics from that growing in its northern enclave and it is considered to be a separate species, Encephalartos senticosus. In 1996 E. senticosus was split from E. lebomboensis. The main differences between the two are in the number, size and form of the male and female cones.

Status
There are believed to be about 5,000 specimens of Encephalartos lebomboensis growing in the wild. It is a popular species with plant collectors and the IUCN Red List of Threatened Species lists it as being "Endangered" because of its over-exploitation and the degradation of its habitat due to the encroachment of agricultural land. It is listed in Appendix I of the CITES Appendices. It is widely available as a cultivated plant.

References

External links
 
 

lebomboensis
Flora of Mozambique
Flora of KwaZulu-Natal
Flora of Swaziland
Flora of the Northern Provinces